Treat is an extinct town in Haralson and Polk counties, in the U.S. state of Georgia.

History
Treat was laid out ca. 1907, and named after a first settler's acquaintance in New York. A post office called Treat was established in 1907, and remained in operation until 1912.

References

Geography of Haralson County, Georgia
Geography of Polk County, Georgia
Ghost towns in Georgia (U.S. state)